Myroxylon balsamum, Santos mahogany, is a species of tree in the family Fabaceae. Plants are found growing in well drained soil in evergreen humid forest.

Varieties
According to the Germplasm Resources Information Network, there are two varieties:
Myroxylon balsamum var. balsamum – Tolu balsam tree
Myroxylon balsamum var. pereirae (Royle) Harms – Peru balsam tree

Description
The tree is large slow growing, reaching  in height. Crown is round with dense foliage and the bark is yellowish with a pungent odor. The rachis and petioles are pubescent and terete. Leaflets are acute to acuminate at the apex, obtuse at the base, glabrous, with an entire margin and glandular oil dots.

Plants bloom 5 years from seeds during the months of February to June. Flowers are white, pubescent and has around 10 stamens.

Uses

Balsam of Tolu and Balsam of Peru are the products of the species' resin. They are extracted from different varieties in different ways. They are marketed among a series of intermediaries and exporters, their destinations being Germany, the United States of America, England and Spain, where they are used in the manufacture of cosmetics and medicines (for diseases of the skin, bronchi, lungs and airways, and in the treatment of burns and wounds). The tree has been planted for Balsam production in West Africa, India, and Sri Lanka.

The wood is reddish and has interlocked grain, which gives it a strong ribbon-like pattern, and logs produce a large amount of knot-free lumber. Myroxylon balsamum wood is used for flooring, furniture, interior trim, and heavy construction. 

M. balsamum is often used as a shade tree in coffee plantations.

References

External links 
 
 

Amburaneae
Flora of Central America
Trees of Brazil
Trees of Mexico
Trees of Peru